Lee Si-woo (born 19 December 1999) is South Korean actor and model. He is best known for his role in the drama Hi Bye, Mama! as Jang Pil-seung.

Filmography

Television series

Music video appearances

References

External links 
 
 
 
 

1999 births
Living people
21st-century South Korean male actors
South Korean male models
South Korean male television actors
Korea National University of Arts alumni